

IAAF Record Progression

References

Pole vault, women
Pole vault, women
World record women
world record
Indoor track and field